{{DISPLAYTITLE:D-xylose 1-dehydrogenase (NADP+)}}

In enzymology, a D-xylose 1-dehydrogenase (NADP+) is an enzyme that catalyzes the chemical reaction

D-xylose + NADP+  D-xylono-1,5-lactone + NADPH + H+

Thus, the two substrates of this enzyme are D-xylose and NADP+, whereas its 3 products are D-xylono-1,5-lactone, NADPH, and H+.

This enzyme belongs to the family of oxidoreductases, specifically those acting on the CH-OH group of donor with NAD+ or NADP+ as acceptor.  The systematic name of this enzyme class is D-xylose:NADP+ 1-oxidoreductase. Other names in common use include D-xylose (nicotinamide adenine dinucleotide phosphate), dehydrogenase, D-xylose-NADP+ dehydrogenase, D-xylose:NADP+ oxidoreductase, and D-xylose 1-dehydrogenase (NADP+).

References

 
 

EC 1.1.1
NADPH-dependent enzymes
Enzymes of known structure